United Nations Security Council Resolution 79, adopted on January 17, 1950, having received and the text of United Nations General Assembly Resolution 300 concerning the regulation and general reduction of conventional armaments and armed forces, the Council decided to transmit the resolution to the Commission for Conventional Armaments for further study in accordance with the Commission’s plan of work.

The resolution was adopted with nine votes. Yugoslavia was present but did not vote, and the Soviet Union was absent.

See also
List of United Nations Security Council Resolutions 1 to 100 (1946–1953)

References
Text of the Resolution at undocs.org

External links
 

 0079
Arms control
January 1950 events